is a passenger railway station in the city of Tsukuba, Ibaraki Prefecture, Japan, operated by the Metropolitan Intercity Railway Company. Its station number is TX18. "Bampaku-kinenkōen" literally means "Expo Memorial Park" and is named after a nearby park built on the site of where Expo '85 was held.

Lines
Bampaku-kinenkōen Station is served by the Tsukuba Express, and is located 51.8 km from the starting point of the line at Akihabara Station in Tokyo.

Station layout
The station consists of two opposed side platforms on a viaduct, with the station building located underneath.

Platforms

History
Bampaku-kinenkōen Station opened on 24 August 2005.

Passenger statistics
In fiscal 2019, the station was used by an average of 3314 passengers daily (boarding passengers only).

Surrounding area
 Site of Expo '85

See also
 List of railway stations in Japan

References

External links 

 TX Bampaku-kinenkoen Station 

Railway stations in Ibaraki Prefecture
Stations of Tsukuba Express
Tsukuba, Ibaraki
Railway stations in Japan opened in 2005